Hexacontium is a genus of protists belonging to the family Actinommidae.

The genus has cosmopolitan distribution.

Species

Species:

Hexacontium arachnoidale 
Hexacontium aristarchi 
Hexacontium armatum-hostile
Hexacontium pachydermum

References

Radiolarian genera